The Free Taiwan Party is a pro-independence political party in Taiwan. It was founded by Pan-Green engineer and activist Tsay Ting-kuei on 17 April 2015 and registered as a political party on 1 May 2015.

The party's main claim is that, in accordance with the UN Charter and the International Covenant on Civil and Political Rights, Taiwan has the right to self-determination and recognition as an independent state if the inhabitants of the island so choose.

References

External links 
 Official website

2015 establishments in Taiwan
Political parties established in 2015
Taiwanese nationalist political parties
Taiwan independence movement